Morganville is a city in Clay County, Kansas, United States.  As of the 2020 census, the population of the city was 180.

History
Morganville was founded in 1870. It was named for its founder, Ebenezer Morgan. The first store in Morganville opened in 1871.

The post office in Morganville was originally called Della. It was established in 1871.

Morganville was located on the Chicago, Rock Island and Pacific Railroad.

Geography
Morganville is located at  (39.467189, -97.203350).

Demographics

2010 census
As of the census of 2010, there were 192 people, 79 households, and 55 families residing in the city. The racial makeup of the city was 97.4% White, 1.0% African American, 0.5% from other races, and 1.0% from two or more races. Hispanic or Latino of any race were 2.6% of the population.

There were 79 households, of which 29.1% had children under the age of 18 living with them, 58.2% were married couples living together, 7.6% had a female householder with no husband present, 3.8% had a male householder with no wife present, and 30.4% were non-families. 26.6% of all households were made up of individuals, and 16.5% had someone living alone who was 65 years of age or older. The average household size was 2.43 and the average family size was 2.89.

The median age in the city was 43.5 years. 23.4% of residents were under the age of 18; 7.9% were between the ages of 18 and 24; 22.5% were from 25 to 44; 28.6% were from 45 to 64; and 17.7% were 65 years of age or older. The gender makeup of the city was 53.1% male and 46.9% female.

2000 census
As of the census of 2000, there were 198 people, 77 households, and 54 families residing in the city. The racial makeup of the city was 96.46% White, 0.51% Native American, 1.01% from other races, and 2.02% from two or more races. Hispanic or Latino of any race were 1.01% of the population.

There were 77 households, out of which 31.2% had children under the age of 18 living with them, 61.0% were married couples living together, 3.9% had a female householder with no husband present, and 28.6% were non-families. 26.0% of all households were made up of individuals, and 11.7% had someone living alone who was 65 years of age or older. The average household size was 2.57 and the average family size was 3.11.

In the city, the population was spread out, with 30.8% under the age of 18, 3.5% from 18 to 24, 22.7% from 25 to 44, 23.7% from 45 to 64, and 19.2% who were 65 years of age or older. The median age was 40 years. For every 100 females, there were 104.1 males. For every 100 females age 18 and over, there were 101.5 males.

The median income for a household in the city was $33,125, and the median income for a family was $36,429. Males had a median income of $24,688 versus $21,563 for females. The per capita income for the city was $12,423. About 2.3% of families and 4.4% of the population were below the poverty line, including 7.7% of those under the age of eighteen and none of those 65 or over.

Education
The community is served by Clay County USD 379 public school district.

Morganville schools were closed through school unification. The Morganville High School mascot was Morganville Eagles.

References

Further reading

External links
 Morganville - Directory of Public Officials
 Morganville city map, KDOT

Cities in Kansas
Cities in Clay County, Kansas